Samuel Lane Loomis (1856–1938) was an American minister and author of Modern Cities and their Religious Problems (1887), a popular and well-regarded work on urban life from the Protestant perspective.

Loomis graduated from Amherst College in 1877 and Andover Theological Seminary in 1880.

References

External links 
 Modern Cities and their Religious Problems

1856 births
1938 deaths
American religious writers
American male non-fiction writers
American Protestant ministers and clergy
Amherst College alumni
Andover Newton Theological School alumni